Valtorta is a comune (municipality) in the Province of Bergamo in the Italian region of Lombardy, located about  northeast of Milan and about  northwest of Bergamo.  

Valtorta borders the following municipalities: Barzio, Cassiglio, Gerola Alta, Introbio, Ornica, Vedeseta.

Ski
Valtorta houses the starting point of a cable way that reaches the ski area of Piani di Bobbio. At Ceresole there was also a cross country ski track.

References